FFF may refer to:

Arts and entertainment

Film festivals
 Fantasy Filmfest, annual genre film festival in Germany
 Fashion in Film Festival, a biennial festival in London and New York City
 FreedomFilmFest, an annual documentary film festival in Malaysia
 Lund International Fantastic Film Festival, a fantastique film festival in Sweden

Music
 Fun Fun Fun Fest, an annual music festival held in Austin, Texas
 "FFF", a song from the album Cryptic Writings by American thrash metal band Megadeth
 "FFF", a song from the album Album by Public Image Ltd
 "FFF", a song from the album Född förlorare by Swedish black metal group Shining
"FFF", a song from the album Poster Girl by Swedish singer Zara Larsson
 "F.F.F.", a song from the EP All Your Fault: Pt. 1 by American singer Bebe Rexha
 fff, in music dynamics, forte fortissimo or fortississimo—as loud as can be played
 F.F.F. (musical), a 1920 Australian musical comedy

Television
FFF, the production code for the 1971 Doctor Who serial The Mind of Evil
Family Food Fight (Australian TV series), a cooking show that is frequently abbreviated to FFF
Family Food Fight (American TV series), a cooking reality competition television series based on the Australian television series

Organisations
 Fridays For Future, a youth-led climate justice movement
 FFF (gang), a gang active in the San Fernando Valley during the 1980s
 Federation of Free Farmers, an agricultural organization in the Philippines
 FFF, ICAO code for Freedom Air Services a defunct Nigerian airline
 Fuck for Forest, an environmental group that raises money through the production of pornography
 Fédération Française de Football (French Football Federation), the governing body of football in France

Breweries
 Triple fff Brewery, a brewery in Alton, Hampshire, England
 Three Floyds Brewing, a microbrewery in Munster, Indiana, U.S.

Science and technology
 Fused filament fabrication, a 3D printing process making use of thermoplastic material
 FFF system, a humorous system of measurement
 Field flow fractionation, a fluid separation technique
 Feed-forward filter, the forward part of decision feedback equalizer

Sport
 Falkenbergs FF, a Swedish football team
 French Football Federation
 Full Force Fighting, an American mixed martial arts promotion

See also
 Five finger fillet, a game played with a knife
 Three Fs, a series of demands first issued by the Tenant Right League in Ireland
 3F (disambiguation)